Different Realities is the fourth studio album by Swedish rock band Siena Root. It´s an album of two musical pieces, where side A is leaning more to the electric side of Siena Root, and side B more to the acoustic. The B-side is a "raagmala", a series of ragas, that stretch from the morning (Bairagi) to midnight (Jog). It's an all analogue production made for reproduction on vinyl. No digital equipment was involved in the making.

Track listing

Credits 
Writing, performance and production credits are adapted from the album liner notes.

Personnel

Siena Root 
 Sam Riffer – bass, double bass, darbuka
 KG West – guitar, sitar, organ, rhodes piano, synthesizer, tzouras
 Love H Forsberg – drums, percussion
 Anna Sandberg – recorder, Rauschpfeife, vocals, tambourine
 Tängman – Hurdy-gurdy, tambourine
 Janet Jones Simmonds – vocals

Production 
 Siena Root – Record producer, recording, mixing, mastering
 Per Ängkvist – recording, mixing
 Christoffer Stannow – mastering

Visual art 
 Siena Root – cover artwork, layout
 Christian Olani – cover artwork, layout

Studios 
 Real Music Studio, Stockholm, Sweden – recording, mixing
 Cosmos Mastering – mastering

Charts

References

External links 
 

2009 albums